Macedonian art may refer to:

 Macedonian art (Byzantine), the period of Byzantine art, during the reign of Macedonian dynasty

- in terms of ethnicity:
 Art of Ancient Macedonians, the art of Ancient Macedonians, during the period of classical antiquity
 Art of Macedonians (ethnic group), the art of Macedonians, a South Slavic ethnic group

- in territorial terms:
 Art of Ancient Macedonia, the art of the ancient Kingdom of Macedonia, during the classical period 
 Art of North Macedonia, the art of North Macedonia, a country in southeastern Europe

See also 
 Macedonian culture (disambiguation)
 Macedonia (disambiguation)
 Macedonian (disambiguation)